A referendum on military rule was held in Madagascar on 8 October 1972. It followed General Gabriel Ramanantsoa taking power from elected President Philibert Tsiranana in May, and Ramanantsoa's proposals for a five-year transition period during which the National Assembly would be suspended. The plans were approved by 94.43% of voters, with an 84% voter turnout.

Results

References

Referendums in Madagascar
1972 referendums
1972 in Madagascar
October 1972 events in Africa
Military reform referendums